Lerma may refer to:

Places

Argentina
Rosario de Lerma
Rosario de Lerma Department, a department located in Salta Province

Italy
Lerma, Piedmont

Mexico
Lerma, Campeche
Lerma, State of Mexico
Lerma Region
Lerma River, Mexico's second longest river
Lerma (Tren Interurbano)

Philippines
Lerma station

Spain
Ducal Palace of Lerma
Lerma, Province of Burgos, municipality in Castile and León

People
 Arnie Lerma (1950–2018), American writer and Scientology critic
 Carlos de Lerma (born 1984), Spanish footballer
 Dominique-René de Lerma (1928–2015), American musicologist
 Duke of Lerma (title)
 Lerma Gabito (born 1974), Filipino long jumper
 Gilberto Lerma Plata (born 1962/63), Mexican drug lord
 Hernando de Lerma (1541–?), Spanish conquistador
 Jefferson Lerma (born 1994), Colombian professional footballer
 Joan Lerma (born 1951), Spanish politician
 Juan Lerma Gómez (born 1955), Spanish neuroscientist
 Luigi de Lerma (1907–1965), Italian ceramist

Other
 Lerma chub, species of fish
 VAM Lerma, an automobile manufactured by Vehiculos Automotores Mexicanos